Twelve ships of the Royal Navy have been named HMS Active or HMS Actif, with a thirteenth announced:

 was a 28-gun sixth rate launched in 1758 and captured in 1778 by two French frigates off San Domingo.
 was a 14-gun brig-sloop launched in 1776 and captured in 1780 by the American privateer General Pickering off New York.
 was a 12-gun cutter that entered service in 1779 and surrendered that same year to the French cutter  when Active encountered and was unable to escape the combined Franco-Spanish fleet in the English Channel. The French took her into service as Actif and later Activ No.1 (1782). She was paid off at Brest in December 1782 and broken up there early the next year.
 was a 32-gun fifth rate launched in 1780 and wrecked in 1796 on Anticosti Island at the mouth of the Saint Lawrence River.
 was a 14-gun brig-sloop listed in 1782.
 was a 16-gun privateer that  captured from the French on 16 March 1794; she foundered on 26 November, although all her crew were saved.
 was a 38-gun fifth rate launched in 1799. She was placed on harbour service in 1826, renamed HMS Argo in 1833, and was broken up in 1860.
 was a 36-gun fifth rate launched in 1845, becoming a training ship and being renamed HMS Tyne in 1867 and HMS Durham in 1867. She was sold in 1908.
 was a  iron screw corvette launched in 1869 and sold in 1906.
 was an  scout cruiser launched in 1911 and scrapped in 1920.
 was an  destroyer launched in 1928 and broken up in 1947.
 was a Type 21 frigate launched in 1972. She was sold to the Pakistan Navy in 1994 and was renamed .
  will be a Type 31 frigate.

Battle honours
Ships named Active have earned the following battle honours:
Lagos, 1759
Trincomalee, 1782
Camperdown, 1797
Egypt, 1801
Lissa, 1811
Pelagosa, 1811
Ashantee, 1873−74
Jutland, 1916
Atlantic, 1939−44
Bismarck, 1941
Diego Suarez, 1942
Arctic, 1944
Falkland Islands, 1982

See also
 
 The schooner Active, which was under the command of Lieutenant Michael Fitton, was a tender to the flagship on the Jamaica station. She assisted  at the capitulation of Curaçao on 13 September 1800.

References

Citations

Bibliography
 
 Demerliac, Alain (1996) La Marine De Louis XVI: Nomenclature Des Navires Français De 1774 À 1792. (Nice: Éditions OMEGA).

Royal Navy ship names